Psilogramma vanuatui is a moth of the  family Sphingidae. It is known from Vanuatu.

References

Psilogramma
Moths described in 2007
Endemic fauna of Vanuatu